Küçükdoğanca can refer to:

 Küçükdoğanca, İpsala
 Küçükdoğanca, Keşan